Toby Rowland (died 1994) was an American theatrical impresario who staged around 30 hit shows in London. His wife was Millie Rowland.

References

American theatre managers and producers
1994 deaths
American emigrants to the United Kingdom
Deaths from cancer
Year of birth missing